Geng Wenqiang (born 11 September 1995) is a Chinese skeleton racer. He competed in the 2018 Winter Olympics.

References

1995 births
Living people
Skeleton racers at the 2018 Winter Olympics
Chinese male skeleton racers
Olympic skeleton racers of China